Manowar is an American heavy metal band. 

Manowar may also refer to:

 , a United States Coast Guard patrol boat
 X-O Manowar, a comic book superhero
 Manowar Island, Queensland, Australia, part of the Manowar and Rocky Islands Important Bird Area

See also
 Man o' war (disambiguation)